Portholland is a settlement in Cornwall, England, UK. It is on the south coast in the civil parish of St Michael Caerhays. The name Portholland comes from the Cornish language elements porth, meaning 'cove' or 'harbour', and Alan, a personal name.

Portholland is two adjacent villages, West Portholland and East Portholland at opposite ends of two separate namesake beaches which join in the middle. It is possible to walk between the two villages on the beach at low tide. East Portholland has a post office and general store. Portholland lies within the Cornwall Area of Outstanding Natural Beauty (AONB).

East Portholland was a filming location for the village scenes of the fictional Welsh island Cairnholm in the 2016 film Miss Peregrine's Home for Peculiar Children.

References

External links
Get Outside - Portholland, Cornwall
Get Outside - East Portholland Cove, Cornwall
Get Outside - West Portholland Cove, Cornwall

Villages in Cornwall